Wuyangcun Station, formerly Wuyang New Town Station during planning, is a  station on Line 5 of the Guangzhou Metro. It is located under the junction of Siyou New Road and Guangzhou Avenue, in Wuyang New Town, Yuexiu District. It opened on 28December 2009.

Station layout

Exits

References

Railway stations in China opened in 2009
Guangzhou Metro stations in Yuexiu District